High Desert is an upcoming comedy television series created and written by Nancy Fichman, Katie Ford and Jennifer Hoppe-House that is set to premiere on Apple TV+. It was originally ordered at Apple in September 2020.

Premise
The series follows Peggy (Arquette), an addict, who decides to make a new start after the death of her beloved mother with whom she lived in the small desert town of Yucca Valley, California. She makes a life-changing decision to become a private investigator.

Matt Dillon will play Denny, Peggy’s ex, and an undeniably charming parolee and a relentless operator. Friend will play Guru Bob, a local ex-anchorman, who, after a trauma, rebrands himself as a mystic desert personality. Opia stars as Carol, Peggy’s closest friend — the bored fiancé of an ER doctor, and a permissive new stepmother — who has a secret of her own. Garrett plays Bruce, a private investigator whose business is circling the drain, and who becomes Peggy’s reluctant employer. Peters will recur as Rosalyn, Peggy’s complicated mother. Taylor recurs as Dianne, Peggy’s buttoned-up sister, who tries to make order of Peggy’s chaos

Cast

Main
 Patricia Arquette as Peggy
 Matt Dillon as Denny
 Rupert Friend as Guru Bob
 Weruche Opia as Carol
 Brad Garrett as Bruce

Recurring
 Bernadette Peters as Rosalyn
 Christine Taylor as Dianne
 Carmine Giovinazzo as Nick Gatchi
 Carlo Rota as Arman
 Jeffrey Vincent Parise as Roger
 Tracy Vilar as Tina
 Keir O'Donnell as Stewart
 Susan Park as Tammy

Episodes

Production
The series, created by Nancy Fichman, Katie Ford and Jennifer Hoppe-House, was given a greenlight in September 2020 by Apple TV+, with Patricia Arquette set to star in the series as well as executive produce along with Ben Stiller, who was set to direct the first episode.

In November 2021, Matt Dillon, Rupert Friend, Weruche Opia and Brad Garrett were added to the main cast of the series, with Bernadette Peters and Christine Taylor cast in recurring roles. Stiller would no longer be directing the first episode, as Jay Roach had joined the series to direct all eight episodes.

Filming began by November 2021 in Long Beach, California.

References

External links
 

Apple TV+ original programming
Upcoming comedy television series
American comedy television series
English-language television shows
Television series by 3 Arts Entertainment
Television series by Red Hour Productions